Tuvan or Tuvinian can refer to:

Of or pertaining to Tuva, a federal subject of Russia
Tuvans or Tuvinians, a Turkic ethnic group living in southern Siberia
Tuvan language, also known as Tuvinian, Tyvan or Tuvin, a Turkic language spoken in the Republic of Tuva
Tuvan throat singing, a singing technique where one can sing in two tones at the same time
Tuvan syndrome, a fictional malady in the Star Trek episode "Inter Arma Enim Silent Leges" (Star Trek: Deep Space Nine)

See also
Tyvan, Saskatchewan

Language and nationality disambiguation pages